At the End of the Day may refer to:

 At the End of the Day: The Sue Rodriguez Story, a Canadian documentary film

 At the End of the Day (Disagree album)
 At the End of the Day (Galactic Cowboys album)
 "At the End of the Day" (song), a song by Kellie Coffey
 "At the End of the Day" (Les Misérables), a song from Les Misérables
 At the End of the Day, an album by Dervish
 "At the End of the Day", a song by Spock's Beard from V
 "At the End of the Day", a song by Wallows from Tell Me That It's Over